The Velvet Touch of Lenny Breau – Live! is a live album by Canadian jazz guitarist Lenny Breau that was released in 1969.

History
After Breau's major-label debut, Guitar Sounds from Lenny Breau, was issued the previous year on RCA, producer Chet Atkins arranged for this live recording in Los Angeles, accompanied by fellow Winnipegers Ron Halldorson and Reg Kelln. Carol Kaye was in the audience and stated in an interview:  The tapes from the three-night engagement were taken back to Nashville where Atkins, Danny Davis and Ronnie Light prepared them for release.

Despite the enthusiasm for the live show, the album sold poorly and was barely mentioned in the music press at the time. Breau was later quoted as saying, "When I initially recorded, I didn't feel ready—I wanted to practice for another 10 years first." He also felt RCA did not sufficiently promote the release. It was 10 years before Breau released another solo album.

Reception

Music critic Paul Kohler of Allmusic wrote "His ability to play chords, melody, and a bass line simultaneously has to be heard to be believed."

Track listing
Writing credits as shown on record label.
"Tuning Time" (Lenny Breau) – 1:49
"No Greater Love" (Peter Ilich Tchaikovsky, John Digges, Domenico Savino) –  6:37
"The Claw" (Jerry Reed) – 4:23
"Indian Reflections for Ravi" (Breau) – 3:12
"That's All" (Merle Travis) –  5:42
"Blues Theme" (Breau) – 1:01
"Mercy, Mercy, Mercy" (Joe Zawinul) – 5:30
"Spanjazz" (Breau) – 5:19
"Bluesette" (Jean Thielmans) – 6:00
"A Taste of Honey" (Ric Marlow, Bobby Scott) – 4:43
"Blues Theme No. 2" (Breau) – 2:40

Personnel
 Lenny Breau – 6-string and 12-string guitar
 Ronnie Halldorson – bass
 Reg Kelln – drums

Production notes
Grover Helsley – engineer
Danny Davis – engineer
Ronnie Light – engineer

References

Lenny Breau albums
1969 live albums
RCA Records live albums
Albums recorded at Shelly's Manne-Hole